Al-Baiyaa Sport Club, is an Iraqi football team based in Baghdad, that plays in the Iraq Division Three.

Managerial history
 Ammar Ridha
 Anad Abid
 Ali Abdul-Wahab Al-Nakar
 Abdul-Wahab Abdul-Razzaq
 Najem Abid Jassim

See also
 2020–21 Iraq FA Cup
 2021–22 Iraq FA Cup

References

External links
 Al-Baiyaa SC on Goalzz.com
 Iraq Clubs- Foundation Dates

2004 establishments in Iraq
Association football clubs established in 2004
Football clubs in Baghdad